Susan Mboya is a corporate executive and philanthropist who is the Principal and International Advisor for Navigators Global a Washington DC based consulting firm. Susan has been a corporate executive for over 25 years and has held a number of senior executive positions at global multinational firms. Susan was the Global Director for Oral B Oral Care at Procter and Gamble for 5 years and was the General Manager of Coca-Cola South Africa from 2008 to 2011. Susan is the immediate former President of the Coca-Cola Africa Foundation and the group director of the Eurasia Africa Group (EAG) for women’s economic empowerment at Coca-Cola. and is the daughter of the late Tom Mboya, a Kenyan nationalist leader, and one of the founding fathers of the Republic of Kenya and the late Pamela Mboya, a renowned diplomat who was Kenya’s representative to UN Habitat. Tom Mboya was a well-known trade unionist, educationist, Pan Africanist, author, and a Cabinet Minister in Kenyas first post-independence Government. She is also the former First Lady of Nairobi County, Kenya's largest county and the capital city and economic centre of Kenya. Susan holds a number of board positions including the Chair of Liberty Group, a publicly traded company in the nairobi stock exchange. Susan is the Founder of the Zawadi Africa Educational Fund, a 501(c)3 non-profit organization that provides scholarships and leadership development training to academically gifted, marginalized African girls to enable them to attend top colleges and universities around the world with the objective of creating a pipeline of African female leaders. The Zawadi Africa program is based on the Africa Student Airlifts program launched by her father and President John F. Kennedy in 1959 that enabled several participants including Barack Obama Sr, father of President Barack Obama, and Professor Wangari Mathaai to study in the U.S.

Education and personal life

Susan Mboya obtained a B.Sc. in pharmacy from the University of Connecticut  in 1988. She then went on to obtain a Master of Science (MSc,  1991) and a doctorate (PhD, 1995) in industrial pharmacy, both at the Massachusetts College of Pharmacy.

Mboya is married to Governor Evans Kidero, the former governor of Nairobi County,  Kenya.  She is the third born child of Tom Mboya and Pamela Mboya.

Career
Susan Mboya has been a senior executive on the global stage for over 25 years, holding a series of positions in General Management. Susan started as a Brand Manager at Procter and Gamble in Cincinnati, Ohio, and became an Associate Director and then a Director working in the Paper Division and in the Oral Care Division. Susan moved to the Coca-Cola Company as the General Manager for the Southern Africa region in 2008 and then became the President of the Coca-Cola Africa Foundation, where she successfully forged public-private partnerships to help resource, fund and provide technical expertise for the foundations initiatives, raising over $120 million in funding towards the 5by20 initiative and working with international partners including USAID, "GETF", DFID, TechnoServe, MercyCorps  and the International Finance Corporation and empowering over 700,000 women.

Zawadi Africa

Mboya is the founder and president of the Zawadi Africa Educational Fund, a non-profit organization modeled on her father’s famed student airlifts of the 1960s which took over 800 East African students to American universities and colleges.

Nairobi County First Lady
In her role as First Lady of Nairobi County Mboya has initiated and championed programs supporting children's education and welfare, women and girls empowerment, women's health and the environment.

Achievements and awards
Susan was inducted into the American Advertising Federation (AAF) Hall of Achievement in 2003 and was awarded African American Marketer of the year by Ebony Magazine in 2004.In June 2009, Mboya was awarded an honorary doctorate in humanities by Lakeland University and was the commencement speaker at Meredith College in 2016 in recognition of her humanitarian activities with the Zawadi Africa Education Fund. In 2016 The University of Massachusetts (UMASS) in Boston awarded Mboya an honorary doctorate for her work with the Zawadi Africa Education Fund and with women’s economic empowerment and philanthropy in Africa

References

External links
Zawadi Africa Educational Fund

Living people
MCPHS University alumni
Year of birth missing (living people)
University of Connecticut alumni
American women business executives
African-American business executives
African-American women in business
21st-century African-American people
21st-century African-American women